Anna Alexandrovna Lapushchenkova (born 24 October 1986) is a former Russian tennis player.

Career
Lapushchenkova began competing occasionally on the ITF Women's Circuit in October 2002, shortly before her 16th birthday. She started to compete regularly early in 2005; and after at first seeming to reach a plateau around world No. 300 in the first half of 2007. She had risen rapidly to No. 140 in January 2008, and to a career-high of No. 93 in May 2010.

She won five $50k titles, one $75k, two $25k, and three $10k titles, and reached the final of one $100k event. She has also beaten several top 100-calibre players at lesser events and in qualifying rounds for WTA Tour events.

ITF Circuit finals

Singles: 18 (11 titles, 7 runner-ups)

Doubles: 5 (1 title, 4 runner-ups)

External links
 
 

1986 births
Living people
Tennis players from Moscow
Russian female tennis players
21st-century Russian women
20th-century Russian women